Sébastien Hinault (born 11 February 1974) is a French former professional road racing cyclist, who competed professionally between 1997 and 2014, competing in seventeen Grand Tours. He now works as a directeur sportif for UCI ProTeam .

Career
Born in Saint-Brieuc, Hinault debuted in 1997 with the French team , which later became , and has competed in the Tour de France five times. After Crédit Agricole disbanded in 2008, Hinault joined . Hinault left  at the end of the 2012 season, and joined the new  team for the 2013 season. Hinault retired from competition at the end of the 2014 season and in October 2014 was announced as a directeur sportif for the  team for 2015.

Although they share the same birthplace and surname, he is not related to former champion cyclist Bernard Hinault.

Major results

1999
 4th Tro-Bro Léon
 8th Grand Prix de Denain
 9th Overall Tour du Limousin
2000
 1st Tour du Finistère
 4th Trofeo Pantalica
 6th Overall Tour du Limousin
 6th Grand Prix d'Ouverture La Marseillaise
 6th Tour de Vendée
 7th Cholet-Pays de Loire
 7th À Travers le Morbihan
 10th Paris–Camembert
2001
 1st Stage 5 (TTT) Tour de France
2002
 3rd Tro-Bro Léon
 10th Tour du Finistère
2003
 1st Stage 4 Tour de Pologne
 2nd Grand Prix de la Ville de Lillers
 3rd Classic Loire Atlantique
 6th Grand Prix de Rennes
 8th Classic Haribo
 10th Cholet-Pays de Loire
2004
 1st Stage 4 Deutschland Tour
 3rd Classic Haribo
 3rd Tour de Vendée
2005
 3rd Overall Circuit Franco-Belge
1st Stage 2
 5th Grand Prix de Villers-Cotterêts
 9th Tro-Bro Léon
2006
 1st Stage 8 Tour de Langkawi
 1st Stage 4 Tour de Picardie
 1st Stage 4 Tour du Limousin
 3rd Tour de Vendée
 4th Overall Four Days of Dunkirk
 10th Brabantse Pijl
2007
 1st Stage 3 La Tropicale Amissa Bongo
 4th Boucles de l'Aulne
 9th Grand Prix d'Isbergues
2008
 1st  Overall Tour du Limousin
1st Stage 3
 1st Stage 10 Vuelta a España
2009
 4th Overall Tour du Limousin
 6th Paris–Bourges
2010
 9th Overall Paris–Roubaix
 9th Overall Vattenfall Cyclassics
2011
 8th E3 Prijs Vlaanderen
2012
 1st Boucles de l'Aulne
 3rd Tour de Vendée
 4th Overall Circuit de Lorraine
1st Stage 3
2013
 7th Overall Four Days of Dunkirk
 9th Tour du Jura

Grand Tour general classification results timeline

References

External links
 

French male cyclists
1974 births
Living people
Sportspeople from Saint-Brieuc
French Vuelta a España stage winners
Directeur sportifs
Cyclists from Brittany